Vanquish is the ninth studio album by the group Two Steps from Hell, released on 2 December 2016. It consists of 17 tracks written by composers Thomas J. Bergersen and Nick Phoenix. The album is the first major public release to include no material from industry album releases. It was recorded live by Capellen Orchestra under the supervision of Petr Pololáník, and features vocal performances by Felicia Farerre, Asja Kadric, Jenifer Thigpen, and Linea Adamson.

The cover artwork and the sleeve are designed by Steven R. Gilmore. The album was made available to the industry via Extreme Music on January 4, 2017.

The album is dedicated to Phoenix's late son, Jack, who was killed in a hit and run incident a year before its release aged 15.

Track listing

Critical reception
Clothilde Lebrun of Trailer Music News was favourable, describing the album as "epic and bombastic at times, inspiring and sweeping at others", albeit not having "the dramatic intensity that some previous industry releases had". Considering the latter, she said it offers "a more diverse listening experience, with very elaborate compositions by Nick Phoenix and more experimental ones by Thomas Bergersen", concluding, "Vanquish is a welcome sequel" to SkyWorld and Battlecry.

The review by Brigid Ehrmantraut published in The Princeton LP was also favourable. She claimed the album was "finessed in comparison with some of the group’s earlier releases". She was most critical of the album's lyrical tracks, calling them an "iffier proposition" compared to tracks featuring choirs. Overall she felt "last year’s output was more compelling" (Classics Volume Two and Battlecry) but that both of the aforementioned "lacked finer points of instrumentation compared with Vanquish". Ehrmantraut concluded: "If Two Steps from Hell classically delivers slices of larger stories and flashes of unfinished dramas, then quite excitingly, Vanquish’s longer numbers, more extensive lyrics, and subtler orchestrations may, in places, be a little closer to offering us fully-fledged plotlines."

IFMCA-associated reviews website, MundoBSO, rated it seven out of ten stars.

Charts

Weekly charts

Year-end charts

References

External links

2016 albums
Two Steps from Hell albums